Robert Yale Shulman (March 28, 1954 – April 13, 2006) was an American serial killer.  Shulman, a postal worker from Hicksville, New York, on Long Island, was convicted of murdering five women between 1991 and 1996, the year when he was arrested.

Victims
Shulman was ultimately convicted of five murders.

Lori Vasquez 
Vasquez was a 24-year-old who lived in Brooklyn. Her body was found on August 31, 1991. Robert Shulman's brother, Barry Shulman, with whom he lived, was convicted of disposing of Vasquez's body in Yonkers.

Lisa Ann Warner 
Warner was an 18-year-old who lived in Jamaica, Queens. Her body was found on April 6, 1995, at a recycling plant in Brooklyn, New York. She had been beaten and dismembered.

Kelly Sue Bunting 
Bunting, also known as "Melani", was a 28-year-old who lived in Hollis, Queens. She worked as a sex worker and was last seen alive on December 8, 1995. Her body was found in Brooklyn wrapped in a sleeping bag. Her hands had been removed.

Meresa Hammonds
Meresa Hammonds was a 31-year-old who lived in New Jersey. She was born in April 1961 in Kentucky as one of seven siblings, and had previously spent time in California and Michigan before moving to New Jersey where she had worked as a fashion model with her sister and left behind two sons. Her initially-unidentified body was discovered on June 27, 1992 in a dumpster in Yonkers, New York. She was referred to as "Yonkers Jane Doe" before being identified in December 2021.

Unidentified

Medford Jane Doe
On December 7, 1994, an unidentified woman was found on the shoulder of Long Island Avenue by an employee of the Suffolk County Department of Public Works between Yaphank and Medford. She had a tattoo on her left arm depicting a red heart and a banner with the name "Adrian". She had been beaten and dismembered.

Investigation
Looking for the murder site, a detective canvassing hotels heard about a man driving a blue Cadillac who cruised the area. Trying to track the man down with this information, women were located who led them, not to a hotel, but to a residence where a blue Cadillac was seen. The registration was obtained, and the car was registered to Shulman's brother.

Trying to get information about the sleeping bag in which Bunting was found, detectives learned Sears was the only manufacturer. Sears was contacted to see if the brother had purchased one with a credit card. Sears said the brother had no card, but pointed out that Shulman had a card. This was how police were initially pointed towards Shulman as a possible culprit.

Women later identified him as the man cruising in the Cadillac, and cadaver dogs signaled the possibility of dead remains having been present in the Cadillac. Police searched Shulman's work place and found trace evidence matching that found on the body. Shulman was arrested on April 6, 1996. After interrogation, Shulman confessed to the three murders. (Shulman confessed to the earliest two murders at a later date.) A search of his room revealed hundreds of bloodstains scattered over almost every surface.

Trial and aftermath
Shulman was sentenced to death in 1999 for the only murder he committed after New York State reinstated the death penalty in 1995. He was sentenced to life imprisonment for his other murders because New York's death penalty law was not in effect at the time he committed them. His sentence was reduced to life in prison after the New York State Court of Appeals invalidated the death penalty in 2004.

Shulman died on April 13 2006, in Albany, New York, of undisclosed causes.

Shulman's brother, Barry, was indicted on charges of hindering prosecution and unlawfully disposing of dead bodies. He pleaded guilty and received a two-year sentence. The sentence angered prosecutors, who had recommended an indeterminate sentence of up to 14 years.

See also 
 List of serial killers in the United States

References

1954 births
2006 deaths
20th-century American criminals
American male criminals
American people convicted of murder
American people who died in prison custody
American prisoners sentenced to death
American prisoners sentenced to life imprisonment
American serial killers
Crimes against sex workers in the United States
Criminals from New York City
Male serial killers
People convicted of murder by New York (state)
People from Hicksville, New York
Prisoners sentenced to death by New York (state)
Prisoners sentenced to life imprisonment by New York (state)
Prisoners who died in New York (state) detention
Serial killers who died in prison custody
Violence against women in the United States